Three Men on the Bummel (also known as Three Men on Wheels) is a humorous novel by Jerome K. Jerome. It was published in 1900, eleven years after his most famous work, Three Men in a Boat (To Say Nothing of the Dog).

The sequel brings back the three companions who figured in Three Men in a Boat, this time on a bicycle tour through the German Black Forest. D. C. Browning's introduction to the 1957 Everyman's edition says "Like most sequels, it has been compared unfavourably with its parent story, but it was only a little less celebrated than Three Men in a Boat and was for long used as a school book in Germany." Jeremy Nicholas of the Jerome K. Jerome Society regards it as a "comic masterpiece" containing "set pieces" as funny or funnier than those in its predecessor, but, taken as a whole, not as satisfying due to the lack of as strong a unifying thread.

The word 'Bummel'

D. C. Browning writes "The title must be puzzling to many readers, for 'bummel' will not be found in English dictionaries." It is a German word, as Jerome does not explain until the end of the book, and apart from his book, it has not received any widespread use in English. (The first American edition, published by Dodd Mead in 1900, was entitled Three Men on Wheels.)

One of the characters in the book asks, "how would you translate [bummel]," to which the narrator replies, in the very final paragraph of the book:
"A 'Bummel'," I explained, "I should describe as a journey, long or short, without an end; the only thing regulating it being the necessity of getting back within a given time to the point from which one started.  Sometimes it is through busy streets, and sometimes through the fields and lanes; sometimes we can be spared for a few hours, and sometimes for a few days.  But long or short, but here or there, our thoughts are ever on the running of the sand.  We nod and smile to many as we pass; with some we stop and talk awhile; and with a few we walk a little way.  We have been much interested, and often a little tired.  But on the whole we have had a pleasant time, and are sorry when it's over."

The general style and manner of the book are similar to its predecessor. It is a series of humorous vignettes, each of which builds slowly, through accumulation of layer on layer of detail, through several pages. Jeremy Nicholas calls these "set pieces." Most of them concern bicycling, genial (if shallow) commentary on German culture from the point of view of a British tourist, or situation-comedy-like depictions of interpersonal interactions between the characters.

Cycling

The novel was written near the end of the Victorian-era bicycle craze, launched by the development of the two-wheeled safety bicycle. It depicts an era when bicycles had just become a familiar piece of middle-class recreational equipment. The references to brand competition, advertising, and enthusiasts' attitudes toward their equipment resonate with modern readers.

The novel invites comparison with H. G. Wells's 1896 humorous cycling novel, The Wheels of Chance.

Many of the comments on cycling are relevant—and funny—today. Those who have purchased ergonomic bicycle saddles, intended to relieve pressure on the perineal nerves, may not know that these are not a new invention:

Germany
Jerome's comic stereotypes of Germany and the German character provide some picture of the country during the period of the German Empire, at least how it was popularly perceived in Britain.

Generally, the country is portrayed as clean and orderly, yet heavily policed, with the authorities strictly enforcing even the most trivial of a vast number of laws and regulations (this causes the three men to frequently be in minor trouble with the law). The German people are described as amiable, unselfish, homely, kind and egalitarian; yet they are also placid and obedient, eager to obey those in authority.

Jerome goes on to comment that it would be consistent with the German character for a criminal condemned to death to be simply given a piece of rope, and told to go and hang himself.

The Englishmen spend some time in the company of students; Jerome describes German Student Corps and their customs of the Kneipe, an organised beer party, and the Mensur, or Academic fencing. The mensur sword duels are described at length, with little humour, and with Jerome expressing extreme disapproval for the tradition.

Jerome would have been aware of Mark Twain's humorous travelogue, A Tramp Abroad (1880), based on a walking tour through similar parts of Germany, with extensive comments on the language and culture.  Three Men on the Bummel follows in this vein. At least one of Jerome's remarks, however, is remarkably prescient:

Comparison with Three Men in a Boat
Jeremy Nicholas says that the book is "unfairly chastised as being an ineffectual afterthought" to Three Men in a Boat, and that "the set pieces (the boot shop, Harris and his wife on the tandem, Harris confronting the hose-pipe, the animal riot in the hill-top restaurant) are as polished and funny (funnier, some would say) as anything in the earlier book." His analysis is that

Adaptations
Hugh Laurie read the book as a Book at Bedtime for the BBC in 2001.

See also
 Stereotypes of Germans

Notes
  D. C. Browning, 1957; introduction to Three Men and a Boat and Three Men on the Bummel; Everyman; J. M. Dent and Sons
  Jeremy Nicholas: Three Men in a Boat and on the Bummel—The story behind Jerome's two comic masterpieces
  D. C. Browning, op. cit.
  American Heritage, 4th edition, does not have it. Webster's Third New International Dictionary, Unabridged. Merriam-Webster, 2002  does not have it in Jerome's sense; it defines "bummel" as "chiefly Scotland, bumble," which in turn is defined as a humming sound, buzz, or rumble.
Both The Chambers Dictionary and the New Shorter Oxford English Dictionary do list 'bummel' in precisely Jerome's sense (a stroll or leisurely journey). Both also give the German Bummel (noun) or bummeln (verb) as the origin of the word 'bum' in all its chiefly American senses. Chambers does have the Scottish variant of 'bumble' (as in bumblebee), but spells it 'bummle'. Bummel  (German)   : No preset destination or goal. Closest English equivalent verb 'aimless loafing'
  (American edition entitled "Three Men on Wheels") Jerome K(lapka) Jerome, Contemporary Authors Online, Gale, 2005
  Jeremy Nicholas, op. cit.
 In the children's book Fungus the Bogeyman by Raymond Briggs (1977), the saddle of Fungus's bicycle is called a bummel, and is partly responsible for the vehicle's propulsion.

External links

 Three Men on the Bummel at Internet Archive (illustrated)
 

1900 British novels
Novels by Jerome K. Jerome
British comedy novels
Novels about cycling
Novels set in Germany
J. W. Arrowsmith books